Mangifera paludosa is a species of plant in the family Anacardiaceae. It is found in Indonesia, possibly Malaysia, and Singapore.

References

paludosa
Endangered plants
Taxonomy articles created by Polbot
Taxa named by André Joseph Guillaume Henri Kostermans